The 11th Pan American Games were held in Havana, Cuba from August 2 to August 18, 1991.

Medals

Bronze

Men's Middleweight (– 86 kg): Hermate Souffrant

Results by event

See also
Haiti at the 1992 Summer Olympics

References

Nations at the 1991 Pan American Games
Pan American Games
1991